The following lists events that will happen during 2015 in Tanzania.

Incumbents
President: Jakaya Kikwete (until 5 November), John Magufuli (starting 5 November)
Vice-President: Mohamed Gharib Bilal (until 5 November), Samia Suluhu (starting 5 November)
Prime Minister: Mizengo Pinda (until 5 November), Kassim Majaliwa (starting 20 November)
Chief Justice: Mohamed Chande Othman

Events

March 
 March 5 -  Flooding kills 42 people near Lake Victoria in the Kahama District.

October
 October 25 - A general election is to be held.

References 

 
2010s in Tanzania
Tanzania
Tanzania
Years of the 21st century in Tanzania